In 2018, Tyler Technologies acquired Socrata, a software company that specialized in data visualization tools. Socrata offered a software system that helped businesses uncover trends and predict statistical outcomes through its data visualization tools. The company also maintained an open data server that was made open source and accessible to everyone through the use of GitHub.

History 
In 2007, Socrata was established in Seattle, Washington in the United States. The company later expanded to have offices in Washington, D.C. and London, UK.

Initially known as Blist, Socrata was introduced as an online database software service provider at the DEMO 2008 conference.

In 2009, the company rebranded as Socrata and shifted its focus towards serving the public sector.

In 2016, Socrata formed a strategic partnership with Motorola Solutions to develop and operate CrimeReports. This resulted in a modern, mobile-friendly crime mapping solution being provided to over 1,200 law enforcement agencies in the US.

In 2018, Socrata was acquired by Tyler Technologies. A majority of the employees joined Tyler and the offices in Seattle and Washington D.C. remained open.

Open Data Network 
In July 2014, Socrata launched the Open Data Network, a machine learning-powered initiative aimed at promoting data-centered collaboration between the public and private sectors. This network provides governments with access to various types of data, including crime data, transit data, 311 service request data, and expenditure data. The San Francisco administration later incorporated the open data network into its operations.

FedRAMP 
In 2017, Socrata was authorized to operate with a Moderate status under the Federal Risk and Authorization Management Program (FedRAMP) of the US Government's General Services Administration (GSA) Program Management Office.

In January 2008, Socrata received its initial series A round of venture capital funding, totaling $6.5 million, from Morgenthaler Ventures and Frazier Technology Ventures. The company later received a series B funding round of $18 million from OpenView Venture Partners, Morgenthaler Ventures, Frazier Technology Partners, and In-Q-Tel in June 2013. In November 2014, Socrata closed a C round of funding, worth $30 million, with Sapphire Ventures as the lead investor and participation from Morgenthaler Ventures, Frazier Technology Ventures, and OpenView Venture Partners.

References 

Defunct software companies of the United States
American corporate subsidiaries
American companies established in 2007
2018 mergers and acquisitions
Software companies based in Seattle
Software companies established in 2007
2007 establishments in Washington (state)